Eduardo Lehman (born 28 April 1910, date of death unknown) was a Brazilian rower. He competed in the men's coxless pair event at the 1936 Summer Olympics.

References

1910 births
Year of death missing
Brazilian male rowers
Olympic rowers of Brazil
Rowers at the 1936 Summer Olympics
Place of birth missing